Otso-Otso Pamela-Mela-Wan is a 2004 Filipino comedy film starring Vhong Navarro and Bayani Agbayani. The title was inspired from the two novelty dance songs popularized by the main actors: "Otso-Otso" and "Pamela".

Plot
In a hospital in 1976, a lone nurse (Gina Pareño) guards newborn babies when a freak storm, earthquake and power outage happens and the babies were mixed up and given to the different families.

In the present day, Amboy and Boy, sons by different families are treated as outcasts, Boy is out of place on his family because he has no talent in singing, while Amboy lacks academic intelligence. Meanwhile in Chinatown, Mao and Dao, who are spoiled by their mother (Tessie Tomas), resist attempts at arranged marriages according to Chinese customs. Boy and Amboy flee to Manila after they misinterpret their unwitting rescue of the Mayor, Pamintuan, from an assassin's bullet through the otso-otso dance as an attack on them, while Mao and Dao go to Ilocos Norte to hitch a boat ride to Taiwan.

They ride separate Partas buses, and met their alternate identities while on stopover in Tarlac, while the Nurse tries to chase them. As they arrive on their destinations, confusion arises. Mao and Dao, who are mistaken for Boy and Amboy, became instant heroes and fit into their "families", especially with Mao having a good singing voice and Dao being intelligent. When Dao is asked to recreate the Otso-Otso dance, he instead creates the Pamela-Mela-Wan dance. After being turned  over to Mrs. Go after the nurse's distraction causes their bus to crash, Boy and Amboy, mistaken for Mao and Dao, try to adjust to the Chinese style of living before learning in a newspaper about their heroism and realizing that Mao and Dao have been mistaken for then. After telling Mrs. Go the truth, they return to Ilocos to confront Mao and Dao, persuading them not to push through with their escape to Taiwan and go back to Mrs. Go, while Mao and Dao convince their alter-egos to stand up to their families, for which they realized that they are loved all along. Boy, Amboy and their families along with Mao, Dao and Mrs. Go attend the Mayor's thanksgiving celebrations, where the latter survives another assassination attempt. The townspeople are confused when the foursome appear, but the Nurse arrives and tells them that the twins were switched due to the aforementioned accident, with Mao being a twin of Boy and Dao being a twin of Amboy. Mao and Dao comfort a distraught Mrs. Go, saying that she will always be their mother before returning to their biological families in celebration and perform their dances.

In the epilogue, the Nurse tracks down Mrs. Go's son, who is raised by an African family, and is overjoyed as she realizes that he is the last baby she has to find.

Cast
 Vhong Navarro as Amboy Cabangon/Dao Go: the sibling who doesn't have a twin but later had (Amboy)/a Chinese brother of Mao (Dao).
 Bayani Agbayani as Boy Ronquillo/Mao Go: the person who always do chores and later had a twin (Boy)/a Chinese brother of Dao (Mao).
 Tessie Tomas as Mrs. Go: the mother of Mao and Dao.
 Pinky Marquez as Mrs. Ronquillo: the mother of Boy.
 Dexter Doria as Mrs. Cabangon: the mother of Amboy.
 Gina Pareño as Tessie: A nurse who tries to fix the twins.
 Michelle Bayle as Tessa: Dao and Mao's maid which Boy became her love interest.
 Denise Joaquin as Mooncake: Dao's supposed to be wife but Amboy is the one who loved her.
 Cherry Lou as Pamela Lou Pamintuan: the daughter of a Mayor which Boy had a crush on her but Mao was mistaken as Boy so she loved Mao.
 Angelene Aguilar as Pamela Zou Pamintuan: the daughter of a Mayor which Amboy had a crush on her but Dao was mistaken as Amboy so she also loved Dao.
 Robin da Roza as Max Ronquillo: the father of Boy.
 Miko Palanca as Gino Ronquillo: the brother of Boy.
 Karel Marquez as Yumi Ronquillo: the sister of Boy.
 Felix Roco as Marky Cabangon: the twin brother of Mocky and brother of Amboy.
 Dominic Roco as Mocky Cabangon: the twin brother of Marky and brother of Amboy.
 Kristine "Boomboom" Gonzales as Cecil Cabangon: the twin sister of Rica and sister of Amboy.
 Katrina "Jaja" Gonzales as Rica Cabangon: the twin sister of Cecil and sister of Amboy.
 Dido dela Paz as Mayor Pamintuan: Pamela Lou and Zou's father who was saved by the gun.
 Jeffrey Tam as Mrs. Go's lost son
 Whitney Tyson as Ita
 Xavier (dog) as Bantay: the dog of Amboy.

References

External links

Philippine comedy films
2004 films
Star Cinema comedy films
2000s Tagalog-language films
2000s Mandarin-language films
2004 comedy films
Films based on songs
Films directed by Jerry Lopez Sineneng